Juan Lavieri (born 31 May 1938) is a Venezuelan sports shooter. He competed in the mixed skeet event at the 1980 Summer Olympics.

References

External links
 

1938 births
Living people
Venezuelan male sport shooters
Olympic shooters of Venezuela
Shooters at the 1980 Summer Olympics
Place of birth missing (living people)
20th-century Venezuelan people
21st-century Venezuelan people